We Are the Strange is an independent animated film directed by M dot Strange. It uses stop motion, CG artwork, and greenscreen effects. The film premiered on January 19, 2007 at the Sundance Film Festival.

Plot
We Are the Strange focuses on "two diametrically opposed outcasts" as they "fight for survival in a sinister fantasy world." These two outcasts are an abused woman named Blue who has a mysterious degenerative disease and a living doll named .

The two meet in the Forest of Still Life, where Blue follows  to Stopmo City on a search for his ideal ice cream parlor. Upon arriving in Stopmo City, they are caught in the middle of a fierce battle between bizarre monsters, making their progress difficult. Thankfully, a hero named Rain appears and easily destroys every monster that faces him. Blue
meets Rain before he partakes in an "impossible battle against the source of all that is evil
in Stopmo City." During the battle, Rain, along with Ori are crushed by Him after Rain states he wants to avenge his son. When the outlook seems grim, a fist made of aluminum foil breaks through the ground and starts the final showdown between good and evil.

Cast 
 David Choe as Rain
 Halleh Seddighzadeh as Blue / Prologue Narrator
 M dot Strange as HIM
 Stuart Mahoney as Ori / The Pasteur
 Chaylon Blancett as The Wooo Monster
 Benjamin Joel Caron as Member of the Cult of the Strange (uncredited)
 John Doremus as Sinistar (archive sound) (uncredited)
 Luis Mendoza as Red Arm (uncredited)
 Lari Teräs as Member of the Cult of the Strange (uncredited)

Other cast 
 Joe Morishige for sound effects editor / sound mixer / additional music / other
 Noboru Morishige for original improvisational violin score
 Chaylon Blancett as film editor
 M dot Strange as film editor

Release
M dot Strange has stated that he wishes to release the film on the Internet rather than in theaters as he will be able to retain all rights to his work, and any profits made thereafter (DVD sales, merchandise, etc.). On July 16, 2006, in an interview, he said he was "trying to finish it in time to make the Sundance film festival".  In an e-mail sent to subscribers on the film's mailing list October 26, 2006, he stated that "The film will be
done in 2 months and will hopefully premiere at a fancy_pants festival in
January...".

According to M. dot Strange's blog he received a call from Sundance saying that We Are the Strange would premiere as part of the Midnight Movie Program at the 2007 Sundance Film Festival. 
The film was released August 2007.

Soundtrack
Six alternate soundtracks and author's commentary, including soundtrack by Noise Inc. are available on the DVD. The music used in We Are the Strange Trailer has been made by chiptune artist Yerzmyey/AY-Riders (a cover of t.A.T.u.'s "30 Minutes") using ZX Spectrum computer.

See also
List of animated feature films
List of stop-motion films
List of computer-animated films
Heart String Marionette
List of anime films

References

External links
 
 
 We Are the Strange at Sundance.org
 New York Times article about premiere
 Brows Held High episode about said 2007 animated film

2007 films
American avant-garde and experimental films
2007 computer-animated films
2000s stop-motion animated films
American independent films
American monster movies
2000s monster movies
2000s avant-garde and experimental films
2000s English-language films
2000s American films